The Manorial Society of Great Britain Limited is a private limited company (by Guarantee)   and incorporated on 30 December 1996. It has a membership of approximately 1,900, comprising Lords of the Manor, feudal barons, peers, and historians mainly from the United Kingdom but also some from the Republic of Ireland.

Its aims are:
To promote the study of English history and traditions, especially the monarchy and British parliamentary institutions
To promote the preservation of manorial records
To promote awareness of "the Lord's privileges and responsibilities in the local community" 
To promote comradeship among men and women of like-mind

Governance
The Governing Council of the Manorial Society of Great Britain in 2018 includes the following members of the British peerage and knightage amongst whom one usually hosts an annual reception at the House of Lords.

The Right Honourable the 10th Earl of Shannon 
The Right Honourable the Lord Sudeley, MA (Oxon), FSA
The Right Honourable Sir Desmond Lorenz de Silva, QC, PC, KStJ
Mr Cecil Humphery-Smith, OBE, FSA

Original foundation
The original Manorial Society was established as a pressure group in 1906 but did not long survive. Another organization claiming to be a revival was registered in 1995 as "The Manorial Society Limited" under Company registration No. 03111590. Both organizations are no longer connected to the original society.

Source of information
Her Majesty's Land Registry refers to the Manorial Society of Great Britain as a source of information in assisting research on manors as officially indicated on HMLR Practice Guide 22.

Publications
In 1996 the Society co-published a guide to Manorial Law.

In 2012 the Society published a Manorial Directory, listing a number of surviving manorial lordships and feudal baronies in Great Britain and Ireland, with their histories and biographical information on their current holders.

References

External links

1996 establishments in the United Kingdom
Organizations established in 1996
History organisations based in the United Kingdom